Rauli Rafael Arvid Tuomi  (15 July 1919 – 2 February 1949) was a Finnish film and stage actor.

Career

Tuomi appeared in 23 films since 1938. He won two Jussi Awards for Best Actor; first from the film Linnaisten vihreä kamari (1945) and the second from "Minä elän" (1948). Alongside his film career, he worked in the Finnish National Theatre, playing successful roles in such plays as Sappho (1945) and Romeo and Juliet (1946).

Personal life

Tuomi was born in Helsinki into a family of actors. His parents were actors Arvi Tuomi and Santa Tuomi while actress Liisa Tuomi was his sister. Rauli Tuomi was married to actress Rakel Linnanheimo for five years until his death from suicide in 1949.

Filmography

Nummisuutarit (1938)
Laulu tulipunaisesta kukasta (1938)
Jumalan tuomio (1939)
Helmikuun manifesti (1939)
Halveksittu (1939)
Aktivistit (1939)
Yövartija vain... (1940)
SF-paraati (1940)
Runon kuningas ja muuttolintu (1940)
Kyökin puolella (1940)
Kaivopuiston kaunis Regina (1941)
Synnin puumerkki (1942)
Kuollut mies vihastuu (1944)
Kartanon naiset (1944)
Linnaisten vihreä kamari (1945)
Rakkauden risti (1946)
"Minä elän" (1946)
Suopursu kukkii (1947)
Pimeänpirtin hävitys (1947)
Naiskohtaloita (1947)
Hedelmätön puu (1947)
Soita minulle, Helena! (1948)
Haaviston Leeni (1948)

References

External links 
 

1919 births
1949 deaths
Male actors from Helsinki
Finnish male film actors
20th-century Finnish male actors
1949 suicides
Suicides in Finland